Hoveysh-e Jadid (also Romanized as Ḩoveysh-e Jadīd) is a village in Seyyed Abbas Rural District, Shavur District, Shush County, Khuzestan Province, Iran. At the 2006 census, its population was 240, in 39 families.

References 

Populated places in Shush County